Verein für Rasenspiele 1921 Aalen e.V., known simply as VfR Aalen, is a German football club based in Aalen, Baden-Württemberg. The football team is part of a larger sports club which also offers its members gymnastics, table tennis, and cheerleading. The club's greatest success came in 2011–12 when it finished second in the 3. Liga and earned promotion to the 2. Bundesliga for the first time.

History

The club was founded on 8 March 1921 out of the football department of the gymnastics club MTV Aalen and has led a largely unremarked existence as a lower division side. In 1939, Aalen was promoted to the first division Gauliga Württemberg, one of sixteen top-flight leagues established through the 1933 re-organization of German football under the Third Reich. They played there until 1945, typically finishing in the lower half of the table.

After the war the club was joined by Boxclub Aalen in 1950. They went on to the third tier Landesliga Württemberg and in 1951 captured the title in what had become the Amateurliga Württemberg (III). After a single season appearance in the 2nd Oberliga Süd in 1951–52 they returned to play in the III and IV divisions over the next two decades. The club slipped to fifth division play in the late 1970s for a couple of seasons before recovering itself. At the turn of the millennium, Aalen managed an advance to the third division Regionalliga Süd and played at that level as a mid-table side from 1999 onwards. A fourth-place finish in 2007–08 qualified them for the new 3. Liga.  They were immediately relegated after just one season, but captured the Regionalliga title in 2011, and returned to third-tier play. A second-place result in 2011–12 earned the team promotion to the 2. Bundesliga. After two good seasons in the league the club finished last in the league in 2014–15 and was relegated.

Following relegation the club experienced financial difficulties and was initially unable to provide coverage for the required €5.6 million for a 3. Liga licence but was eventually able to apply for one. It deregistered its reserve team, VfR Aalen II, playing in the fifth tier Oberliga, to save money. In December 2016, the club filed for bankruptcy while competing in the 2016–17 season, leading to a nine point-deduction decided by the DFB on 10 March 2017.

Honours

League
 3. Liga
 Runners-up: 2012
 Oberliga Baden-Württemberg (IV)
 Champions: 1999
 Amateurliga Württemberg (III)
 Champions: 1951
 Amateurliga Nordwürttemberg (III)
 Champions: 1974, 1975
 Verbandsliga Württemberg (IV-VI)
 Champions: 1980, 1983, 2014‡

Cup
 Württemberg Cup
 Winners: 1972, 1979, 1986, 2001, 2002, 2004, 2010
 Runners-up: 1987, 1992, 1999

 ‡ Denotes title won by reserve team.

Players

Current squad

Recent managers
Recent managers of the club:

Recent seasons
The recent season-by-season performance of the club:

VfR Aalen

VfR Aalen II

 With the introduction of the Regionalligas in 1994 and the 3. Liga in 2008 as the new third tier, below the 2. Bundesliga, all leagues below dropped one tier.

Key

Stadium
The team plays its home matches in the OSTALB-ARENA – popularly known as the Rohrwang – which has a capacity of 11,183.

References

External links

VfR Aalen at Weltfussball.de
Das deutsche Fußball-Archiv historical German domestic league tables 
The Abseits Guide to German Soccer

 
Football clubs in Germany
Football clubs in Baden-Württemberg
Association football clubs established in 1921
1921 establishments in Germany
Ostalbkreis
2. Bundesliga clubs
3. Liga clubs